"Determined" is a song by American metal band Mudvayne and the first single from their 2005 album Lost and Found.

Music
The song contains elements of thrash metal and hardcore punk.

Music video
The music video for "Determined" shows the band playing the song in front of a large group of moshing fans. It was recorded in New York City.

Appearances in other media
The censored version of the song is featured in the soundtrack to Need for Speed: Underground 2.

Live performance
Mudvayne performed the song live for the first time in early 2005 during a small clubs tour. It has since become a regular part of the band's setlist.

Reception
Johnny Loftus of AllMusic called the song "one of Mudvayne's all-time strongest tracks". It also received praise from The Baltimore Sun.

The song was nominated at the 2006 Grammy Awards for Best Metal Performance but lost to Slipknot's "Before I Forget".

Sources

External links 
 Official music video

2005 singles
Mudvayne songs
2005 songs
Thrash metal songs
Epic Records singles
Songs written by Chad Gray
Songs written by Ryan Martinie
Songs written by Matthew McDonough
Songs written by Greg Tribbett
Music videos directed by Dale Resteghini